New Tricks is a British police procedural comedy-drama that follows the fictional Unsolved Crime and Open Case Squad (UCOS) of the Metropolitan Police Service. The show was created by Roy Mitchell and Nigel McCrery, and premiered in 2003 with a 90-minute special, which later resulted in the show's first full series airing. New Tricks ran for twelve series – from 2003 until 2015 – concluding on 6 October 2015. BBC controller Charlotte Moore and BBC drama controller Ben Stephenson explained the reason behind the show's cancellation on 24 February 2015, stating that "it's important to make room for new series and continue to increase the range of drama on the channel".

The original cast of New Tricks consisted of Amanda Redman, Dennis Waterman, James Bolam, and Alun Armstrong, and were dubbed a "dream team" by the Controller of BBC's Drama Commissioning Ben Stephenson; however, on 18 September 2011, Bolam announced he would be leaving the show. Almost three months later, on 11 January 2012, Denis Lawson was revealed as Bolam's replacement. On 18 August 2012, Redman announced she too, would be leaving the show. Just four days later, on 22 August 2012, Armstrong also quit the show. Replacements for Redman and Armstrong included former EastEnders actress Tamsin Outhwaite, who was announced on 8 May 2013, and Nicholas Lyndhurst, best known for his roles in Only Fools and Horses, The Piglet Files, Goodnight Sweetheart, After You’ve Gone and Rock and Chips whose replacement casting was announced earlier, on 14 November 2012. The show's final remaining original cast member, Waterman, decided to quit the show on 19 September 2014. Following Waterman's departure, former EastEnders and Gavin and Stacey actor Larry Lamb joined the cast.

Waterman, best known for his roles in The Sweeney and Minder who played Gerry Standing in the police procedural comedy-drama series died on 8 May 2022 aged 74, in Madrid, Spain.

Series overview

Episodes

Pilot (2003)

Series 1 (2004)

Series 2 (2005)

Series 3 (2006)

Series 4 (2007)

Series 5 (2008)

Series 6 (2009)

Series 7 (2010)

Series 8 (2011)

Series 9 (2012)

Series 10 (2013)

Series 11 (2014)

Series 12 (2015)

References

External links 
 

Lists of British crime television series episodes
Lists of British drama television series episodes